The Edwin C. Denby High School is a public secondary education school located at 12800 Kelly Road in northeastern Detroit, Michigan. Denby High opened in 1930, and the building was listed on the National Register of Historic Places in 2005. It is a part of Detroit Public Schools Community District.

History
The school was named for Edwin C. Denby, an attorney and former Michigan legislator. Mr. Denby served as Secretary of the Navy during the administration of Warren G. Harding. Denby was forced to resign his position and narrowly avoided criminal indictment for his role in what came to be known as the Teapot Dome scandal. Denby died in 1929, and the Detroit School Board quickly voted to name a new high school after him "at the earliest opportunity."

Later in 1929, the school board authorized the construction of this school and hired the firm of Smith, Hinchman & Grylls to design it. The building cost $351,649, with an additional $145,991 for the land the school is sited on. The first unit of the school, containing 19 classrooms, two study halls, and an office, opened in 1930 with about 1000 students and 38 teachers. However, only two months after the school opened, work began on a major addition. The addition, costing $338,121 and containing sixteen additional classrooms and four study halls, was completed in 1931. Enrollment soared to 2600 in 1931, and by 1934, Denby adopted double sessions to relieve the overcrowding. A third unit of the school was planned in 1938 and completed in 1939 at a cost of $893,000. This unit contained seventeen additional classrooms, art and music rooms, "domestic science" classrooms, two machine shops, an auditorium which seated 2,230, a large gymnasium with an indoor track, and a swimming pool.

The third unit gave Denby a capacity of 2875 students. In 1942, 830 students graduated from the high school, and over 800 graduated each year from 1946 through 1960. The school converted to a three-year high school in 1960, with ninth graders moved to junior high schools. The school still averaged about 800 graduates per year through 1975, but the number of students graduating declined sharply in the late 1970s to a low of only 269 in 1980.

At one time it was known for its mathematics department which ranked high in U.S. national rankings. Rochelle Riley of the Detroit Free Press wrote that by 2010 Denby was "known more for its academic decline than" for the said mathematics department.

By 2010 Kenyetta "K.C." Wilbourn-Snapp began her term as principal of Denby. Wilbourn, who was called the "female Joe Clark", was known for carrying a baseball bat which she called the "equalizer", ever since she witnessed the beating death of a student at Finney High School on April 12, 2007 while serving as that school's assistant principal. In 2016, Wilbourn-Snapp pleaded guilty to felony charges of bribery conspiracy and tax evasion for her role in a kickback scheme during her time at Denby.

In 2011, the school completed an $16.5 Million renovation to restore the 1930s auditorium and construct new student meeting areas. The same year, Denby was transferred from Detroit Public School System (DPS) to the Education Achievement Authority. There was subsequently significant turnover of department heads and school leadership, which cycled through three principals between 2012 and 2015. The principal of Denby is currently Tanisha Manningham.

DPS has said it will re-assume control of Denby High in fall 2017.

Description

The original 1929/1930 Denby High School building is a symmetrical three-story multi-colored brick structure measuring 391 feet long by 117 feet wide. The middle section of the facade is sheathed in concrete, and each half of the building features a concrete-sheathed entrance and a projecting wing. Art Deco stylistic elements are applied to the facade of the building; these include terra cotta panels with ship and lamp reliefs, designed and made by sculptor Corrado Parducci.

The Parducci tiles include two types of reliefs used repeatedly throughout the facade. The first is a relief of a lamp with a flame which symbolizes the lamp of knowledge. The tile includes chevrons and zigzags above and below the lamp. The second is a relief of a warship, symbolizing the naval background of Edwin Denby. Two guns extend from the ship, below which are zigzags representing waves.

The front facade includes strong vertical and horizontal lines. The center of the facade is arranged into seven vertical sections, with the central bays projecting slightly farther than outer ones. Terra cotta tiles appear between windows, accentuating the vertical lines, and above and below, accentuating the horizontal. In addition to the Parducci tiles, other decorative elements include arches at the top of the stairwell windows, a small roof parapet, and checkerboard brick patterns in the middle section of the building.

The 1939 addition to the rear of the building, measuring 232 feet long by 196 feet wide, is also three stories, and the design is compatible with the original construction. The addition has the same terra cotta tiles around and between windows and concrete surrounding stairwell windows on the  sides of the building. However, the terra cotta tiles on the original building do not appear on the addition.

On the interior, the floors of the hallways and stairwells are originally terrazzo covered. Brownish tiles cover the walls to a height of seven feet, and lockers line much of the walls. Classrooms generally have original wood doors and cabinetry.

Demographics
The demographic breakdown of the 725 students enrolled for the 2013–2014 school year was as follows:
Male – 50.0%
Female – 50.0%
Native American/Alaskan – 0.0%
Asian/Pacific islander – 0.2%
Black – 99.2%
Hispanic – 0.0%
White – 0.6%

Notable alumni

 Victor Alexander, professional basketball player
 Bill Bonds, Detroit TV news anchorman
 Ed Budde, offensive guard for Super Bowl IV champion Kansas City Chiefs
 Kim Carson, radio personality
 Wally Cox, actor
 Wayne Dyer, author and speaker
 Antonio Granger, professional basketball player
 Julie Harris, (attended) movie and television actress
 Curtis Hertel, politician
 Dennis M. Hertel, U.S. Congressional representative from Michigan
 John C. Hertel, politician
 Jerry Hodak, Detroit TV personality
 Nancy Milio, academic
 Len Okrie, MLB catcher and coach
 Shantee Orr, NFL player
 Willie Osley, NFL player
 Carmella Sabaugh, politician
 John Schubeck, national news broadcaster and top amateur golfer
 Donnie Simpson, entertainer
 Dave Soutar, former professional bowler

 Jack Van Impe, religious broadcaster
Roger Young, Olympic athlete
 Sheila Young, winner of three Olympic medals in speed skating, three world championships in cycling

References

Further reading

 Hadley, Mari. "A principal, a baseball bat ? and questions." Detroit Free Press. June 1, 2010.

External links

EAA Website - Denby

High schools in Detroit
Buildings with sculpture by Corrado Parducci
School buildings on the National Register of Historic Places in Michigan
Educational institutions established in 1938
Art Deco architecture in Michigan
National Register of Historic Places in Detroit
1930 establishments in Michigan
Public high schools in Michigan
 
Educational institutions established in 1930
Detroit Public Schools Community District
School buildings completed in 1930